KCYN (97.1 FM) is a radio station broadcasting a country music format. Licensed to Moab, Utah, United States, the station is currently owned by Moab Communications, LLC and features programming from CBS News Radio, Compass Media Networks, Premiere Networks, and Westwood One.

References

External links
 Official website

CYN
Country radio stations in the United States
Radio stations established in 1998
1998 establishments in Utah